Blackburn West was a parliamentary constituency in the town of Blackburn in Lancashire.  It returned one Member of Parliament (MP)  to the House of Commons of the Parliament of the United Kingdom, elected by the first past the post system.

The constituency was created for the 1950 general election, when the former two-member Blackburn constituency was divided into Blackburn East and Blackburn West.  It was abolished only five years later, for the 1955 general election, when it was partly replaced by a new single-member Blackburn constituency.

Boundaries
1950–1955: The County Borough of Blackburn wards of Park, St Andrew's, St Luke's, St Mark's, St Paul's, St Peter's, and St Silas's.

Members of Parliament

Elections

Elections in the 1950s

References 

Parliamentary constituencies in North West England (historic)
Constituencies of the Parliament of the United Kingdom established in 1950
Constituencies of the Parliament of the United Kingdom disestablished in 1955
History of Blackburn with Darwen